The Disco Biscuits are an American jam band from Philadelphia. The band consists of Allen Aucoin (drums), Marc "Brownie" Brownstein  (bass guitar, vocals), Jon "The Barber" Gutwillig  (guitar, vocals), and Aron Magner (keyboards, synths, vocals). The band incorporates elements from a variety of musical genres with a base of electronic and rock. Their style has been described as trance fusion.

History 
The Disco Biscuits formed in 1995 at the University of Pennsylvania. Brownstein, Gutwillig, Magner, and the original drummer, Samuel "Sammy" Altman, bonded over a shared affinity for psychedelic rock, electronic music, soul, blues, jazz and classical music. This eclectic mix of interests helped inspire their distinctive style of live electronic music, which is sometimes called 'trance fusion'. The term references the band's choice to incorporate elements of trance music - specifically the driving, rhythmically repetitive drum beats and melodic sections that repeat and evolve over time - into the instrumentation and conventions of a live jam-band where guitar, bass, keyboards, and drums play structured songs with sections for exploratory improvisation. 

The band honed their style while playing at bars and fraternity-house shows in the Philadelphia area in the mid-1990s. Bassist Marc Brownstein credits the improvisational ingenuity demonstrated by the jam-band Phish during the 95-97 tours as a particular inspiration for the Disco Biscuits' unique sound. He recognized that improvisation-inclined bands (largely inspired by Phish and the Grateful Dead) needed to differentiate their sound in meaningful ways in order to stand out in the underground mid-to-late-1990s live music scene, and the Biscuits members' interest in electronic music provided an excellent opportunity to explore a unique sound. 

The band received particular acclaim from fans during their 1999 tours for the thoughtful setlist compositions mixed with exploratory improvisation. This era (which has been referred to as 'the nine-nine' by Disco Biscuits fans) featured energetic musical improvisation that incorporated new musical elements while still remaining enjoyable to more mainstream jam-band audiences whose tastes tended to gravitate towards folk-rock and blues. 

The first inklings of what ultimately became trance-fusion emerged during shows played by the band shortly after keyboardist Aron Magner incorporated a Roland JP-8000 into his live setup in late 1997. This analog-modeling synthesizer (which incidentally also features prominently in the popular track Sandstorm by Finnish electronic artist Darude) supplied sounds that lent a distinctly electronic flavor to jams that were in most other ways typical Phish-inspired blues-rock improvisations. The Halloween 1997 set at the Phi Kappa Gamma fraternity house near the University of Pennsylvania campus is unofficially recognized as the first show that incorporated the JP-8000, helping cement the Biscuits' connection to live, improvised electronic music. 

In 2005 drummer Sammy Altman left the band to pursue a career in medicine. The band began a search for their next drummer ending with a two-night, sold-out drum-off concert at the Borgata's Music Box in Atlantic City. In December 2005 Allen Aucoin was announced as the newest member of the band. Aucoin knew members of the Biscuits' road crew and had opened for the Biscuits in the past. In 2006 the band purchased the Old City Philadelphia studio space that had previously belonged to DJ Jazzy Jeff. The space became a place for local musicians to congregate and work, culminating in the unique collaborations recorded in recording studio efforts known as the Planet Anthem sessions. Around the time Planet Anthem was released, the Biscuits also collaborated with noted hip-hop producer Damon Dash working on a variety of projects.

Camp Bisco 

The first Camp Bisco took place in August 1999 in Cherrytree Pennsylvania, the band seeking to combine the creative effects of electronic DJs with improvisational rock. Over 17 years Camp Bisco has grown by leaps and bounds, with its lineup expanding to include acts such as Shpongle, Lotus, Pretty Lights, Bassnectar, Gramatik, and STS9. The band celebrated its fifteenth anniversary of the festival during July 2017 on Montage Mountain in Scranton, Pennsylvania.

Camp Bisco was canceled in 2020 due to the COVID-19 pandemic. The band participated in the drive-in "Pavement Rave" concert series at the same venue as a replacement event. The 2021 festival was also canceled, citing that it could not be organized in time without compromising the experience. Two concert dates in Philadelphia were organized as a replacement, headlined by the band and Lotus.

Rock operas 
Brownstein and Gutwillig have each written rock operas. Gutwillig was first, writing the Hot Air Balloon sometime before it debuted on December 31, 1998, at Silk City in Philadelphia. Brownstein wrote the Chemical Warfare Brigade in early 2000 while on hiatus from the band. It debuted at the Trocadero Theater in Philadelphia on August 19, 2000 along with his side project Electron. The Disco Biscuits played the Chemical Warfare Brigade for the first time at the Vanderbilt in Plainview, New York on December 30, 2000. In 2022 the band begun to debut parts of a third opera entitled Revolution in Motion.

Philanthropy 
The Disco Biscuits are involved in a number of charitable efforts including food drives and raising money for hurricane relief. In 2004, Browstein (along with Andy Bernstein, author of The Pharmer's Almanac) founded HeadCount, a national, nonpartisan, non-profit, organization that partners with musicians to promote participation in democracy in the United States by registering voters at concerts. In 2010, the keyboardist Aron Magner was named to the Board of Directors for the Philadelphia Young Playwrights theatre arts program.

Discography 
 Encephalous Crime (self-released, 1996)
 Uncivilized Area (1998)
 Bisco Lives (2000)
 They Missed the Perfume (2001)
 Bisco Lives 2: Freedom Boulevard (2002)
 Señor Boombox (2002)
 Trance Fusion Radio Broadcast Vol. 1-4 (2003)
 Under the Influence: A Jam Band Tribute to Lynyrd Skynyrd (2004)
 The Wind at Four to Fly (2006)
 Rocket 3 (2006)
 On Time EP (2009)
 Widgets EP (2009)
 Planet Anthem (2010) US #157 Heatseekers #5
 Otherwise Law Abiding Citizens (2011)
 Another Plan of Attack EP (2022)
 Shocked (2023)

Band members
 Jon Gutwillig – Guitar, Vocals
 Marc Brownstein - Bass, Vocals
 Aron Magner - Keyboards, Vocals
 Allen Aucoin - Drums (2005–present)
 Sam Altman - Drums (1995-2005)

Filmography 
 Live at the Palladium (2004)
 Camp Bisco IV (2005)
 Jam in the Dam (2006)
 Progressions (2007)
 Bisco Inferno 09/10 (2011)

See also
List of electronic music festivals
List of jam band music festivals

References

External links 

 

Jam bands
Jammy Award winners
Electronic music groups from Pennsylvania
Musical groups from Pennsylvania
Musical groups from Philadelphia
Livetronica music groups
Music festivals established in 1999
Musical groups established in 1995
1995 establishments in Pennsylvania